Kupenda for the Children is an American 501(c)(3) non-profit organization that works to improve the lives of children with disabilities in low- and middle-income countries.

History 
In 1999, Leonard Mbonani, a Kenyan special needs teacher, met Cynthia Bauer, an American graduate student, while she was conducting wildlife research on the coast of Kenya. Cynthia was born without her left hand and discovered that many people in Kenya believed disabilities like hers were caused by curses. She also learned that she may have even been killed if she had been born there. When Leonard introduced Cynthia to children with disabilities who did not have access to medical care or education, this inspired her to respond. In addition to providing educational assistance and medical interventions, Cynthia and Leonard worked with families and communities to change superstitions connected to disability. As a result of these efforts and needs, Kupenda for the Children was registered as an official nonprofit in 2003 with the vision of a fully-integrated society where people of all abilities have access to health, education, and a loving community.

Strategy and programs 
"Kupenda ("love" in Kiswahili) for the Children is a registered 501(c)(3) nonprofit organization that has developed disability advocacy and training programs geared towards transforming negative beliefs surrounding disability to those that improve children's lives. Kupenda's vision is for a fully integrated society where people of all abilities have access to health, education, and a loving community. Kupenda focus on changing the views of community members and leaders who in many areas of the world, view people impacted by disability as cursed, leading to their neglect, abandonment, abuse, rape, and murder. Kupenda's primary focus is on children with disabilities who are often marginalized and excluded groups in society according to the World Health Organization.

Kupenda's multilevel strategy is consistent with the social ecological model for social and behavioral changes that improve the lives of people living with disabilities:

 Individual and family: Kupenda supports individuals impacted by disabilities and their families with community-based rehabilitation and equips them to advocate for their rights.
 Community: Kupenda creates training and outreach care programs to address harmful beliefs and practices perpetrated at the community level by families, leaders, and residents and train them as disability advocates.
 Environmental: Kupenda focuses is efforts to influence the economic and policy environment by equipping people impacted by disability and influential leaders to create systemic changes that support disability justice.
 Global: Kupenda forges ongoing partnerships to provide technical assistance to government partners and other organizations to implement best practices for disability inclusion and then partners with these entities for broader influence.

The organization's strategy is directed towards three major program areas:

 Advocacy Program - Educating families and communities about the rights of children with disabilities and how to support them by advocating for their medical care, education, legal rights, and inclusion in all aspects of society
 Education Program - Supporting children with disabilities to access appropriate, high-quality education while supporting the staff and infrastructure of their schools
 Medical Care Program - Connecting children with disabilities to appropriate medical services, including surgeries, medications, and therapy

Partner organization 
Kupenda for the Children is registered in the U.S., and its partner organization, Kuhenza for the Children, is registered in Kenya. Both organizations report to their respective national governments, manage their own operational funds, and are overseen by their own Boards of Directors. Each year, Kuhenza and Kupenda collaboratively fundraise to support their joint projects. The organizations have been co-designing and co-implementing disability programs since 2003.

Geography 

Kupenda's Innovation and Testing Center is in Kilifi County, Kenya, where they have worked alongside Kuhenza for the Children to help thousands of children with disabilities access care and support since 1999. This county is also where they use human-centered design strategies to develop and test their disability training content for pastors, traditional healers, as well as other government and other community leaders. Kupenda's disability advocacy approaches and materials are also being led, adapted, and replicated by other organizations and government entities around the world.

 Austria	Light for the World

 Benin	Hope Walks

 Burundi	World Relief, Hope Walks

 Burkina Faso	Hope Walks

 DRC	World Relief, Hope Walks

 Ethiopia	CURE International, WEEMA, Hope Walks

 Ghana	Hope Walks

 Haiti	Pazapa, Help for Haiti

 Kenya	Kuhenza, Catholic Relief Services (CRS), Hope Walks, Sasa Harambe, KESHO, Bethany Children’s Trust, Compassion international, Bethany Kids, CURE International, World Vision

 Malawi: World Relief, Cure International, Hope Walks

 Mozambique:	Hope Walks

 Niger:	CURE International, Hope Walks

 Philippines:	CURE International

 Rwanda:	World Relief, Hope Walks

 Sierra Leone:	International Theological Education Network (ITEN), EduNations, World Hope International (WHI)

 Sudan:	Hope Walks

 Tanzania:	Kulea Childcare Villages, LOCIP, EMFRED, TRACED, Autism Beyond Borders, Longido, Mennonite Central Committee, St. Philips Theological College, Support Bridge for Students with Disabilities (SBSD), Data for Local Innovation

 United States:	Massachusetts Disabled Persons Protection Committee (DPPC), Travel and Give, University of Louisiana Lafayette, University of Virginia, Eastview Christian Church, Collaborative on Faith and Disability 

 Uganda:	Kyaninga Child Development Centre, Ekisa Ministries, Cure International

 Zambia:	CURE International, Special Hope Network, CRS, Lilato, Ministry of Community Development and Social Services of Zambia, Hope Walks

 Zimbabwe:	Disability and Agriculture Resource Center, CURE International

Beneficiaries 
Kupenda works with children and youth between the ages of 0 and 25 who are living with a long-term disability. They use the United Nation’s definition of disability, which includes “those who have long-term physical, mental, intellectual or sensory impairments, which in interaction with various barriers, may hinder their full and effective participation in society on an equal basis with others.” Some examples of their beneficiaries’ disabilities include albinism; attention deficit hyperactivity disorder (ADHD); autism spectrum disorder (ASD); bipolar disorder; blindness and visual impairment; brittle bone disease (osteogenesis imperfecta); cerebral palsy (CP); cleft palate or lip; club foot (talipes); dissociative identity disorder (DID); Down syndrome; dwarfism; dyslexia; epilepsy; fetal alcohol syndrome disorders (FASD); generalized anxiety disorder; hearing impairment; hydrocephalus; limb deformity, loss, or reduction; major depression; microcephaly; muscular dystrophy; obsessive-compulsive disorder; post-traumatic stress disorder (PTSD); reactive attachment disorder (RAD); schizophrenia; spina bifida (SB); spinal cord injury; spine curvature disorders; Tourette syndrome; and traumatic brain injury (TBI).

Activities 
Leonard Mbonani, a Kenyan special needs teacher, met Cynthia Bauer, an American graduate student, while she was conducting wildlife research on the coast of Kenya in 1999. Cynthia was born without her left hand and discovered that many people in Kenya believed disabilities like hers were caused by curses. She also learned that she may have even been killed if she had been born there. When Leonard introduced Cynthia to children with disabilities who did not have access to medical care or education, this inspired her to respond. In addition to providing educational assistance and medical interventions, Cynthia and Leonard worked with families and communities to change superstitions connected to disability. As a result of these efforts and needs, Kupenda for the Children was registered as an official nonprofit in 2003 with the vision of a fully-integrated society where people of all abilities have access to health, education, and a loving community.

1998 – Cindy Bauer first travels to Kenya as a biologist and learns about the challenges Kenyan children with disabilities face.

1999 – Cindy meets Leonard, a Kenyan special need teacher, who introduces her to children with disabilities on the coast of Kenya.

2000-2002 – Cindy and Leonard collaborate on small-scale projects to raise funds and awareness for the children.

2003 – Cindy registers Kupenda for the Children in the U.S. as an official 501(c)3 nonprofit.

2006 – A significant growth period allows Cindy and Leonard to formalize Kupenda's programs and hire a full-time staff. On May 6th, Cindy receives a gold award in the volunteer category from the Federal Executive Board for founding Kupenda for the Children.

2008 – To improve locally-led, long-term solutions, Cindy and Leonard found Kuhenza for the Children and register this affiliate organization in Kenya.

2009 – A teacher's death due to false information from her church inspires Kupenda and Kuhenza to develop a disability advocacy training program for pastors.

2013 – The success of Kupenda's Pastor Disability Training Program inspires the staff to develop similar trainings for traditional healers, government officials, Muslim leaders, teachers, parents, and NGOs (including disability persons organizations), including parnerships with organizations such as Cross International.

2014–present – Rising national and global interest in Kupenda's disability advocacy model inspires partners in 17 countries to begin using these approaches and tools to train families and local leaders as disability advocates in their own communities.

2017–2018 – Under a grant from the United Kingdom’s Department for International Development (DFID), Kupenda conducted an 18-month, mix-method program evaluation that showed how UN Disability Training Program for Community Leaders were effective in reversing negative beliefs about disability.

2021 – Releases a documentary film Kupenda that is awarded Best Long Documentary at the Inclús, Barcelona International Disability Film Festival, and screened at ReelAbilities and Beloit International Film Festival.

2022 –  Kupenda becomes a member of the International Disability and Development Consortium. 

2022 – Joins a USAID-project led by Action Against Hunger USA as a project resource partner.

Technical Services 
Kupenda is a niche organization focused on improving justice, care, and inclusion for families impacted by disability. Each year, Kupenda's work improves quality of life for more than 70,000 children with disabilities in low- and middle-income countries. Based on the organization's 23 years of disability program design and implementation experience, Kupenda in collaboration along with Kuhenza, has provided technical services and training models directly to individuals and through training programs to other disability organizations, to include:

 Training and counseling for individuals with disabilities, their families, and community leaders
 Adaptation and testing of materials and services
 Community or program disability needs assessments
 Disability program monitoring and evaluation support
 Consultation on disability inclusion programming and best practices
 Disability grant/proposal research and writing support

References

External links 
 
 https://kuhenza.org/

Charities based in New Hampshire
Medical and health organizations based in New Hampshire
Health charities in the United States
Charities for disabled people
Foreign charities operating in Kenya
Kilifi County